Kelly Ann Ryan (born July 10, 1972 in Minneapolis, Minnesota) is a convicted criminal and former International Federation of BodyBuilders professional fitness champion.

Early life and education 
In 2005, her official website biography said she was a graduate of the University of South Carolina and that her hometown was Greenville, South Carolina.

Career
Her first fitness competition was the NPC South Carolina State in 1995, where she placed first.

She would eventually end up winning eight fitness competitions.  Her background and presence in fitness contests made her a familiar face at fitness expositions as well as in fitness magazines.

Ryan placed second 4 times in a row (2000-2004) in the Fitness Olympia.

Personal life
She was married to bodybuilder Craig Titus. In prison she filed for divorce, which became final in December 2009.

Involvement in the murder of Melissa James
On December 14, 2005 the burnt corpse of Melissa James, a woman who was in a sexual relationship with Titus and lived in Ryan and Titus' home,  was discovered inside a Jaguar car belonging to Kelly Ryan. The couple went into hiding together and were arrested along with suspected accomplice, Anthony Gross, after a nine-day investigation.

A Nevada prosecutor alleged in open court that Titus was part of a plot to murder three witnesses due to testify in the case. No charges were filed and Titus’ defense lawyer said he didn't think that there was enough evidence for charges in the allegation.

While awaiting trial, in April 2006, Ryan’s mother died of a heart attack said to have been precipitated by stress.

The trial of co-defendant Anthony Gross on arson and accessory to murder charges was separated from the murder trial for Titus and Ryan.

On May 31, 2008, rather than going through a trial, Ryan and Titus pleaded guilty to reduced charges. Ryan pleaded guilty to one count of arson, entering an Alford plea to one count of battery with a deadly weapon resulting in significant bodily harm. She was sentenced to two consecutive terms of 3–13 years in prison.

On December 23, 2011, the Nevada Parole Board granted Ryan parole on the assault charges. She remained incarcerated to begin serving time for the arson charge. On September 2, 2014, Ryan was  denied parole  on the second charge.

On October 24, 2017 Ryan was released on parole after serving a nearly 12-year prison sentence at a Las Vegas area prison, having pleaded guilty to reduced charges in 2008 in connection with the death of Melissa James.

Stats 
Height:   5' 3"
Weight:   120 lbs. Competition; 125 lbs. Off-season

Competition history 
2004 Fitness International – 2nd place
2003 Fitness Olympia – 2nd place
2003 Night of Champions (fitness) – Champion
2003 Fitness International – 3rd place
2002 GNC Show of Strength – Champion
2002 Fitness Olympia – 2nd
2002 Jan Tana Pro Fitness – 1s
2002 Show of Strength Pro Fitness – 1st
2002 Southwest Pro Fitness – 1st
2001 Fitness Olympia –2nd
2001 Pittsburgh Pro Fitness – 1st
2001 Jan Tana Classic – 1st
2001 Fitness International – 2nd
2000 Fitness Olympia – 2nd
2000 Fitness International – 1st place
1999 IFBB Fitness Olympia – 2nd place
1999 IFBB Jan Tana Classic – 1st place
1999 World Pro Fitness – 2nd place
1998 Ms. Fitness America – 1st place
1998 Team Universe Fitness Championships – 1st place and overall winner
1996 NPC Junior USA Fitness – 3rd

References 

1972 births
Living people
American people convicted of arson
American people convicted of assault
American prisoners and detainees
Fitness and figure competitors
Sportspeople from Minneapolis
Sportspeople from Greenville, South Carolina
Prisoners and detainees of Nevada
People who entered an Alford plea
American sportswomen
University of South Carolina alumni
Criminals from Minnesota
21st-century American women